Lauran is a feminine given name. Notable people with the name include:

Lauran Bethell, American Baptist missionary
Lauran Paine (1916–2001), American writer

See also
 Laura (given name)

Feminine given names